Gregory Karlen (born 30 January 1995) is a Swiss professional footballer who plays for St. Gallen as a midfielder.

Personal life 
Gregory's brother Gaëtan is also a professional footballer.

References

External links

1995 births
Living people
Swiss men's footballers
Swiss Super League players
Swiss Challenge League players
FC Sion players
FC Thun players
FC St. Gallen players
Association football midfielders